The following is a list of notable events and releases of the year 1989 in Norwegian music.

Events

March
 17 – The 16th Vossajazz started in Voss, Norway (March 17 – 19).

May
 24 – The 17th Nattjazz started in Bergen, Norway (May 24 – June 7).

June
 25 – The 20th Kalvøyafestivalen started at Kalvøya near by Oslo

Albums released

Unknown date

G
 Agnes Buen Garnås
 Rosensfole (ECM Records), with Jan Garbarek

K
 Karin Krog
 Something Borrowed ... Something New (Meantime Records)

Deaths

 August
 31 – Conrad Baden, organist, composer, music educator, and music critic (born 1908).

 December
 28 – Fred Lange-Nielsen, jazz bassist and vocalist (born 1919).

Births

 January
 4 – Trond Bersu, Electronica and jazz drummer and vocalist.

 February
 6 – Marius Njølstad, singer, songwriter and music producer.
 8 – Matias Tellez, singer, songwriter, composer and music producer.

May
 8 – Christian Skår Winther, jazz guitarist.

 June
 6 – Kristoffer Eikrem, jazz trumpeter, composer and photographer.
 23 – Amina Sewali, singer, songwriter, and actress.

October
 27 – Jakob Terjesønn Rypdal, jazz guitarist.

November
 20 – Magnus Skavhaug Nergaard, jazz upright-bassist.

 Unknown date
 Berit Hagen, guitarist and singer.
 Hans Hulbækmo, drummer, vibraphonist, and composer.
 Ingrid Helene Håvik, songwriter and vocalist.

See also
 1989 in Norway
 Music of Norway
 Norway in the Eurovision Song Contest 1989

References

 
Norwegian music
Norwegian
Music
1980s in Norwegian music